1941 in philosophy

Events

Publications 
 Erich Fromm, Escape from Freedom (1941)
 Gershom Scholem, Major Trends in Jewish Mysticism (1941)

Philosophical literature 
 Jorge Luis Borges, The Library of Babel (1941)
 Maurice Blanchot, Thomas the Obscure (1941)

Births 
 January 22 - Jaan Kaplinski 
 February 16 - John Brockman 
 March 19 - Joxe Azurmendi
 May 24 - George Lakoff 
 June 24 - Julia Kristeva
 August 23 - Onora O'Neill
 September 24 - Jesús Mosterín, Spanish philosopher (died 2017)
 September 28 - David Lewis (died 2001)

Deaths 
 January 4 - Henri Bergson (born 1859) 
 April 16 - Hans Driesch (born 1867)
 April 24 - Benjamin Lee Whorf (born 1897)
 August 7 - Rabindranath Tagore (born 1861)

References 

Philosophy
20th-century philosophy
Philosophy by year